The 1859 Kentucky gubernatorial election was held on August 1, 1859. Democratic nominee Beriah Magoffin defeated Whig Joshua Fry Bell with 53.10% of the vote.

General election

Candidates 

 Beriah Magoffin, Democratic
 Joshua Fry Bell, Whig

Results

References 

1859
Kentucky